Kujtim Çoçoli (born 12 September 1952) is an Albanian footballer. He played in three matches for the Albania national football team in 1981.

References

External links
 

1952 births
Living people
Albanian footballers
Albania international footballers
Place of birth missing (living people)
Association football defenders
FK Dinamo Tirana players
FK Partizani Tirana players